Percy Davies Rundell (20 November 1890 – 24 March 1979) was an Australian cricketer. He played thirty first-class matches for South Australia between 1912/13 and 1925/26. He was an all-rounder for Port Adelaide in district cricket.

See also
 List of South Australian representative cricketers

References

External links
 

1890 births
1979 deaths
Australian cricketers
South Australia cricketers